Jared Comstock Gregory (January 13, 1823, in Butternuts, New York – February 17, 1892) was mayor of Madison, Wisconsin. He became a lawyer and married Charlotte C. Camp in 1848. They  had three children. He moved to Madison in 1858. He was Episcopalian.

Political career
While still living in New York, Gregory was elected a justice of the peace. In 1856, he was candidate for the United States House of Representatives from New York's 19th congressional district, losing to Oliver A. Morse. After moving to Wisconsin, he served as mayor of Madison from 1873 to 1874. In 1870, he was again a candidate for the United States House of Representatives, this time from Wisconsin's 2nd congressional district, in a special election following the death of Benjamin F. Hopkins. He would lose to David Atwood. Gregory ran again from the same district in 1880, losing to incumbent Lucien B. Caswell. He was a Democrat.

References

People from Butternuts, New York
Mayors of Madison, Wisconsin
Wisconsin Democrats
New York (state) Democrats
Wisconsin lawyers
New York (state) lawyers
1823 births
1892 deaths
19th-century American politicians
19th-century American lawyers